Joo Hyun Mi (Hangul: 주현미, born September 27, 1961) also known as Choo Hyun-mi, Ju Hyun-mi, Zhou Xuanmei or Chow Shiuan-mei, is a South Korean legendary singer, who is one of the nation's most successful trot singers. She debuted in 1984, but her big break came in 1985 when she released the song, "Rainy Yeongdong Bridge." Joo Hyun Mi has released more than 40 albums during her career. She often appears on the KBS 1TV 'Golden Oldies()'.

Early life
Joo Hyun Mi was born in 1961 to Korean-Chinese parents from Shandong in Gwangju, South Korea. She attended Seoul Chinese Primary School and studied pharmaceuticals at Chung-Ang University. While in university, she received an award for competing in the MBC Riverside Song Festival. Upon graduating, she worked as a pharmacist.

Career 

Joo debuted in 1984 with the trot medley album Couple's Party. The album established her reputation as a singer and sold 1 million copies. The following year, in 1985, she released the single, "The Rainy Yeongdonggyo Bridge," which became one of her most popular songs.

Her second album, Joo Hyun Mi 2, won the Grand Prize (Daesang) at the 1988 Golden Disc Awards.

Personal life
Joo is married to singer and guitarist Im Dongsin (Hangul: 임동신), who performed on Cho Yong Pil's album Cho Yong Pil and the Great Birth. They have two children.

Filmography

Television shows

Awards

Golden Disc Awards

Other awards

State honors

Notes

References

External links 
 Official website
 Official YouTube Channel

Grand Prize Golden Disc Award recipients
Trot singers
South Korean women pop singers
South Korean radio presenters
South Korean pharmacists
South Korean Roman Catholics
South Korean people of Taiwanese descent
Chung-Ang University alumni
People from Gwangju
1961 births
Living people
Women pharmacists
South Korean women radio presenters